Unpopular Books is a publisher in London's East End, producing leaflets, pamphlets, and books.

Published work

Leaflets, pamphlets and booklets 
 Jean Barrot - What is Communism (1984)
 Jean Barrot - Fascism/Antifascism
 Jean Barrot - What is Situationism (1986)
Ruins of Glamour, Glamour of Ruins (1986)
 Jacques Camatte - The Echo of Time (1988)
 Alan Cohen - Decadence of the Shamans: Or Shamanism as a Key to the Secrets of Communism (1992) 
 Class Struggle in a German Town by Temp workers on the construction site of the nuclear power plant Philippsburg
 London Psychogeographical Association and the Archaeogeodetic Association - The Great Conjunction: The Symbols of a College, the Death of a King and the Maze on the Hill  (1993) 
 Asger Jorn - Open Creation and its Enemies (1994) 
 Luther Blissett & Stewart Home - Green Apocalypse (1995).  (See also )
 Luther Blissett - Militias - Rooted in White Supremacy (1997)
 Richard Essex (ed.) - The Revolution is Not a Masonic Affair (1997)
 Ivan Chtcheglov - Formulary for a New Urbanism
 Jean Barrot - ‘’Fugitive Father’’ (1998)
Escaping a paranoid cult: A selection of texts from the 1981 spilts unmasking the ICC's Stalinist fabrications against Chenier (1999)

Books 
 Stewart Home - The Assault on Culture: Utopian currents from Lettrisme to Class War (published with Aporia Press, 1988) 
 Anonymous - Black Mask & Up Against the Wall Motherfuckers - The incomplete works of Ron Hahne, Ben Morea, and the Black Mask Group (1993) 
 James Carr - Bad - an autobiography (published with Pelegian Press, 1995)
 Daniel Lux - Camden Parasites (1999)

See also 
 Unpopular Books
 Unpopular Books material at Libcom

Book publishing companies of the United Kingdom
Left communism
Political book publishing companies